Russell Vale is a small suburb of Wollongong in the Illawarra region of New South Wales, Australia.

Geography 
Russell Vale straddles the Princes Highway.

History 
Russell Vale was the home and estate of surveyor Francis Peter MacCabe, who died in 1897. The name Russell was the maiden name of his mother (Margaret née Russell). The estate was originally . In April 1904, 116 lots were subdivided and sold. In November 1904, a further 96 lots were subdivided and sold. The house at Russell Vale was demolished in 1966.

Sporting amenities 

Russell Vale is the home of the Russell Vale Golf Course, opened in 1986. It also contains the soccer field of Cawley Park, the homeground of the Russell Vale Soccer Club.

Demographics 

Median family incomes in Russell Vale were slightly below average for the Wollongong LGA at $1,728 per week, compared with $1,710 per week respectively. Despite this, median rents were $30 per week greater in Russell Vale at $350 than in the rest of the Wollongong LGA, although median monthly mortgage repayments were the same at $1950.

Mining 
Russell Vale Colliery is an underground coal mine under the Woronora Plateau in the Sydney Drinking Water Catchment Area to the west of Russell Vale. The mine has been in operation since the 1880s using various underground mining methods to mine different coal seams. 
More recently, the mine has come under attack from local residents, as subsidence and cracking attributed to the mine's activities have been observed in the catchment area

Gallery

References 

Suburbs of Wollongong